Paula Törnqvist (born 24 February 1964) is a Swedish equestrian. She competed at the 1996 Summer Olympics and the 2000 Summer Olympics.

References

1964 births
Living people
Swedish female equestrians
Olympic equestrians of Sweden
Equestrians at the 1996 Summer Olympics
Equestrians at the 2000 Summer Olympics
Sportspeople from Gothenburg